ISO 3166-2:CG is the entry for the Republic of the Congo (called simply "Congo" in the standard) in ISO 3166-2, part of the ISO 3166 standard published by the International Organization for Standardization (ISO), which defines codes for the names of the principal subdivisions (e.g., provinces or states) of all countries coded in ISO 3166-1.

Currently for the Republic of the Congo, ISO 3166-2 codes are defined for 12 departments. All subdivisions changed their status to departments in 2002.

Each code consists of two parts, separated by a hyphen. The second part is either of the following:
 three letters: Brazzaville
 a number: remaining departments

Current codes
Subdivision names are listed as in the ISO 3166-2 standard published by the ISO 3166 Maintenance Agency (ISO 3166/MA).

Click on the button in the header to sort each column.

Changes
The following changes to the entry are listed on ISO's online catalogue, the Online Browsing Platform:

See also
 Subdivisions of the Republic of the Congo
 FIPS region codes of the Republic of the Congo

External links
 ISO Online Browsing Platform: CG
 Departments of the Republic of Congo (Congo Brazzaville), Statoids.com

2:CG
ISO 3166-2
Republic of the Congo geography-related lists